Lia Emele Finocchiaro (born 20 September 1984) is an Australian politician. She has been a Country Liberal Party member of the Northern Territory Legislative Assembly for the seat of Spillett since her election in 2016. She became Leader of the Opposition in the Northern Territory after the resignation of Gary Higgins on 1 February 2020.  
She was previously the member for Drysdale from 2012 to 2016.

Early life
Finocchiaro was born in the Northern Territory and grew up in Palmerston. She attended local primary schools before completing her secondary education at Kormilda College. While in high school, she became "the highest-ranking army cadet in the Northern Territory". She studied the International Baccalaureate diploma, then graduated with a double degree in law and international studies from the University of Adelaide. She returned to Darwin in 2008, and was admitted as a legal practitioner in the Northern Territory, commencing work as a graduate clerk at the Clayton Utz law firm. She also received a Graduate Diploma of Legal Practice from Charles Darwin University.

Parliament

|}
In 2012, the Country Liberal Party preselected Finocchiaro for the central Palmerston seat of Drysdale in that year's election, instead of sitting CLP member Ross Bohlin, who unsuccessfully ran against her as a conservative independent. She was the youngest MLA in the history of the Legislative Assembly.

On 7 March 2013, Finocchiaro was elevated to the Second Mills Ministry, becoming Minister for Sport and Recreation, Racing, Statehood, Young Territorians and Senior Territorians.  Aged 28, she was the youngest minister in Territory history. However, she was dropped from the ministry on 14 March after Adam Giles successfully challenged then-Chief Minister Terry Mills only a week later.

Following a redistribution of electoral boundaries, Finocchiaro sought CLP preselection for the new seat of Spillett, taking in strong conservative suburbs between Darwin and Palmerston—including her base in Durack.  She defeated Treasurer Dave Tollner for CLP preselection.  Finocchiaro went into the 2016 election with a notional majority of 17.9%, making Spillett the CLP's safest seat in Darwin/Palmerston at the time.

CLP deputy leadership
On election night, the Territory swung heavily to Labor, which won a landslide majority government.  However, Finocchiaro weathered this massive Labor wave with only a small swing against her in Spillett, proving to be in the least danger of the CLP's elected members. She was the only CLP member whose reelection was assured on election night, and for a few days it was possible that she would be the only CLP member left in the legislature. Ultimately, Finocchiaro was joined by fellow second-term member Gary Higgins.  Meanwhile, her previous seat of Drysdale was lost to Labor candidate Eva Lawler.

On 2 September, Higgins, the sole survivor of the Giles cabinet, became CLP leader and opposition leader, with Finocchiaro as his deputy. Finnochiaro faced the task of helping the CLP recover from one of the worst defeats of a sitting government at the state or territory level in Australia. The CLP was recognised as the Official Opposition after the Solicitor-General advised that the five independents could not realistically form an alternative government. Although the CLP was well short of the numbers for official status in the chamber, the new Labor government of Michael Gunner promised that the CLP would be properly resourced as an opposition.

As the sole opposition MPs in the Assembly, Higgins and Finocchiaro divided all opposition portfolios between them. Finocchiaro served as Shadow Minister for Justice and Attorney-General, as well as Shadow Minister for Police, Fire and Emergency Services, Health, Children, Territory Families, Education, Trade, and Essential Services. She also served as Opposition Whip. This was unusual, since the Opposition Whip is responsible for ensuring party MPs toe the official party line. However, Finocchiaro did not have any responsibility to keep anyone in line since she and Higgins were the only members of the CLP party room.

Leader of the Opposition
On 1 February 2020, Higgins resigned as CLP leader and opposition leader, with Finocchiaro replacing him. Former Chief Minister and Territory Alliance Leader Terry Mills claimed to have replaced her as Opposition Leader on 18 March 2020, however this claim was not formalised by the Legislative Assembly.

On 24 March, Finocchiaro raised a motion under standing orders which allowed the assembly to decide on the opposition party, with the CLP winning opposition status by 5 votes to 3.

Finocchiaro led the CLP to a modest recovery at the 2020 Territory election. The CLP picked up a six-seat swing, increasing its seat count to eight and reducing Labor to a bare majority of two.

On 11 September 2021, Finocchiaro's party suffered a further election loss when Labor's Dheran Young won a by-election to the Assembly seat of Daly, which was being vacated by Country Liberal Party MLA Ian Sloan, marking the first time the Governing party had won a seat off the opposition in a by-election.

Personal life
Finocchiaro is married to Sam Burke, the son of former NT chief minister Denis Burke. She is of Italian descent and has been "heavily involved in the NT's Italian community", including as CEO of the Italian Festival Association of the Northern Territory.

References

External links
Lia Finocchiaro – Candidate for Drysdale (Country Liberal Party)

1984 births
Living people
Members of the Northern Territory Legislative Assembly
Country Liberal Party members of the Northern Territory Legislative Assembly
Leaders of the Opposition in the Northern Territory
21st-century Australian lawyers
Adelaide Law School alumni
Australian people of Italian descent
Charles Darwin University alumni
21st-century Australian politicians
21st-century Australian women politicians
Women members of the Northern Territory Legislative Assembly
Women deputy opposition leaders